The General Confederation of Trade Unions or GCTU (Vseobshchya Konfederatsya Profsoyuzov or VKP) is an international trade union confederation. It was founded on 16 April 1992 and incorporates members from the Commonwealth of Independent States.

The GCTU claims a membership of 75 million and is led by Mikhail Shmakov as president.

Member Unions

National Trade Union Centers 
The national trade union centers affiliated with the GCTU as of 2009 included:
Federation of Independent Trade Unions of Russia
Federation of Trade Unions of Ukraine
Federation of Trade Unions of Belarus
National Trade Union Confederation of Moldova
Georgian Trade Union Confederation
Confederation of Trade Unions of Armenia
Azerbaijan Trade Unions Confederation
Federation of Trade Unions of the Republic of Kazakhstan
Kyrgyzstan Federation of Trade Unions
Federation of Independent Trade Unions of Tajikistan

Industrial Trade Union Internationals 
The industrial trade union internationals with the GCTU as of 2009 included:

International Association of Civil Aviation Workers' Unions
International Amalgamation of Unions of Automobile and Farm Machinery Workers
International Organisation of Agro-Industrial Trade Unions
International Confederation of Atomic Energy Workers' Unions
International Confederation of Water Transport Workers' Unions
Trade Union International of Workers in Geology, Geodesy and Cartography
Federation of Mining and Metallurgical Workers' Unions 
International Trade Union Federation of State and Public Employees
International Confederation of Railway Workers' and Transport Builders' Unions
International Trade Union Alliance of Public Utilities, Local Industry and Services Workers
International Confederation of Health Workers' Unions
Consultative Council of Cultural Workers' Unions 
Federation of Timber and Related Industries Workers' Unions of the Commonwealth of Independent States
International Organisation of Metalworkers' Unions
International Association of Trade Unions of Workers in Scientific Research and Production Co-operatives and Enterprises
International Confederation of Trade Unions of Workers in the Oil and Gas Industries and Construction Workers in the Oil and Gas Complex
International Community of Defence Industry Workers' Unions
International Organisation of Trade Unions of Educational and Scientific Workers. (IOTU "Education & Science")
Trade Union International of Workers in Radio-electronic Industry
International Association of Fishing Industry Workers' Unions
International Organisation of Communications Workers' Unions
International Confederation of Joint Venture Workers' Unions
International Confederation of Construction and Building Materials Industry Workers' Unions
International Association of Textile and Light Industry Workers' Unions
International Public Organisation "Confederation of Unions of Workers in Commerce, Restaurants, Consumers' Co-operatives and Various Forms of Business"
International Federation of Transport and Road Construction Workers' Unions
International Association of Chemical and Allied Workers' Unions
International Trade Union Association "ELEKTROPROFSOYUZ"("ELECTROUNION")

See also 

World Federation of Trade Unions

References

External links
www.vkp.ru - website.

 
Trade unions established in 1992
Trade unions in Russia